Russell Malmgren (April 16, 1905 – October 1982) was an American sound engineer. He was nominated for an Academy Award for Best Special Effects at the 17th Academy Awards for work on the film Secret Command. He worked on more than 50 films during his career.

References

External links

1905 births
1982 deaths
American audio engineers
People from Chicago
Engineers from Illinois
20th-century American engineers